James Hannay McGaul ( – 14 December 1921) was an English businessman who was mayor of Birkenhead. He was a building contractor with a business in Liverpool, but devoted his spare time to football and public office. He was president of Tranmere Rovers F.C. from their inception in 1884 until they became a limited company in 1912. He became mayor of Birkenhead in 1908–9 and a justice of the peace.

References 

Tranmere Rovers F.C. non-playing staff
1841 births
1921 deaths
Date of birth missing